Webe Celine Kadima (born 1958) is an associate professor of chemistry at the State University of New York at Oswego.

Early life 

Kadima was born in Burundi and moved to the Democratic Republic of Congo when she was 4 years old. She had to get the support of a government official to be included in the chemistry program at the University of Kinshasa, and after a year there she transferred to the University of Montreal, from which she graduated with a degree in chemistry. Her father was a diabetic and died from complications from diabetes while she was at the University of Montreal. In her research for it she discovered that cadmium binds within the red blood cell mostly to glutathione and to a lesser degree to hemoglobin.

Career

After graduating from the University of Alberta, Kadima held several different teaching positions and eventually became a professor at the State University of New York at Oswego. In 2004 she went back to the Congo for a sabbatical to collaborate on research projects, concentrating her research on plants used in the Congo to treat diabetes. She created a nonprofit called the Bioactive Botanical Research Institute, whose mission was to investigate medicinal plants used in the Congo and to develop pharmaceutical preparations that would be affordable, useful, and safe. She has also worked to create an ongoing exchange of African students with the State University of New York at Oswego. In 2010 it was announced that she had received a $200,000 National Science Foundation grant for the study of how to expand the number of women in science.

In July 1983, she published the results of her  research on a proton nuclear magnetic resonance study of the interaction of cadmium with human erythrocytes together with Rabenstein, Isab and Mohanakrishnan. She was later first author on a paper looking at the stability of the cadmium-glutathione complex in hemolysed red blood cells. In the Inorganica Chimica Acta she published an article about the kinetics of palladium ethylenediamine chloride in solution.

Scientific publications
 Webe Kadima and Michael Hanson: A NMR Study of the T3R3 to R6 Allosteric Transition in the Iron-substituted Insulin Hexamer. Working Paper, Jan 2017.
 Webe Kadima, Angela Nugroho, Deborah Kerwood and  Phil Borer: The T- to R-Allosteric Transition in the Cadmium-substituted Insulin Hexamer. Research, Jan 2016.
 Webe Kadima: Diabetes Screening in Kinshasa, Democratic Republic of Congo. Research, Jan 2016.
 Helle Birk Olsen, Melissa R Leuenberger-Fisher, Webe Kadima, [...], Michael F Dunn: Structural signatures of the complex formed between 3-nitro-4-hydroxybenzoate and the Zn(II)-substituted R 6 insulin hexamer. Oct 2003, Protein Science.
 Webe Kadima: Role of Metal Ions in the T- To R-Allosteric Transition in the Insulin Hexamer. Nov 1999, Biochemistry.
 W. Kadima, P. Raharivelomanana and B. Bechtel: The binding of cyclic adenosine 3′, 5′ monophosphate to the insulin hexamer. Jan 1997, Protein and Peptide Letters.
 W Kadima, L Ogendal, R Bauer, [...] and P Porting: The influence of ionic strength and pH on the aggregation properties of zinc-free insulin studied by static and dynamic laser light scattering. Biopolymers. Dec 1993, Biopolymers.
 W Kadima,  M Roy, R. W. K. Lee, [...], M F Dunn: Studies of the association and conformational properties of metal-free insulin in alkaline sodium chloride solutions by one- and two-dimensional 1H NMR. Jun 1992, Journal of Biological Chemistry.
 Webe Kadima, Alexander McPherson, Michael F. Dunn and Frances Jurnak: Precrystallization aggregation of insulin by dynamic light scattering and comparison with canavalin. Mar 1991, Journal of Crystal Growth.
 Webe Kadima and Dallas L. Rabenstein: A quantitative study of the complexation of cadmium in hemolyzed human erythrocytes by 1H NMR spectroscopy. Nov 1990, Journal of Inorganic Biochemistry.
 Webe Kadima and Dallas L. Rabenstein: Nuclear magnetic resonance studies of the solution chemistry of metal complexes. 26. Mixed ligand complexes of cadmium, nitrilotriacetic acid, glutathione, and related ligands. J Inorg Biochem. May 1990, Journal of Inorganic Biochemistry.
 W Kadima, A McPherson, M F Dunn and F.A. Jurnak: Characterization of precrystallization aggregation of canavalin by dynamic light scattering. Feb 1990, Biophysical Journal.
 Karl F. Houben, Webe Kadima, Melinda Roy and Michael F. Dunn: L-Serine analogs form Schiff base and quinonoidal intermediates with Escherichia coli tryptophan synthase. May 1989, Biochemistry.
 Dallas L. Rabenstein, Anvarhusein A. Isab, Webe Kadima and P Mohanakrishnan: A proton nuclear magnetic resonance study of the interaction of cadmium with human erythrocytes. Aug 1983, Biochimica et Biophysica Acta.
 W. Kadima and M. Zador: Kinetics on interaction of Pd(en)Cl2 with inosine in chloride containing aqueous solutions. Jan 1983, Inorganica Chimica Acta.
 Webe Celine Kadima: NMR studies of the interaction of Cd(II) with ligands of biological interest and with red blood cells.

References

1958 births
American women chemists
Living people
State University of New York at Oswego faculty
Université de Montréal alumni
University of Alberta alumni
Democratic Republic of the Congo academics
University of Kinshasa alumni
Democratic Republic of the Congo expatriates in the United States
American women academics
21st-century American women